"Second Wind" is a song co-written and recorded by the American country music artist Darryl Worley. It was released in March 2001 as the third and last single from the album Hard Rain Don't Last. The song reached #20 on the Billboard Hot Country Singles & Tracks chart. The song was written by Worley and Steve Leslie.

Background
Musically, this song is somewhat unusual for country music in that the introduction fades in and uses an arrangement and instrumentation, such as synthesizers. The fade out is similar to the introduction. The body of the song is a more typical country ballad.

Content
The song uses the gentle Gulf breezes as a metaphor for overcoming the pain of a break-up. Thus, catching your 'second wind' is both catching a fresh breeze off the Gulf of Mexico and overcoming the adversity of a break-up.

Chart performance

References

2001 singles
2000 songs
Darryl Worley songs
Songs written by Darryl Worley
Song recordings produced by Frank Rogers (record producer)
Song recordings produced by James Stroud
Music videos directed by Shaun Silva
DreamWorks Records singles